Veolia Water East, formerly known as Tendring Hundred Water Services, was a privately owned company supplying water to the Tendring peninsula in north east Essex within an area of . In July 2009, the company, a subsidiary of Veolia Water UK since 1989, part of Veolia Environment, changed its name from Tendring Hundred Water.

In 2012, following the sale of Veolia Water's UK water supply business, it was merged with Veolia Water Southeast and Veolia Water Central to form Affinity Water on 1 October 2012.

See also
Waste management
Water privatization
Water supply

References

External links

Veolia
Former water companies of England
Companies based in Essex
Food and drink companies established in 1989
Food and drink companies disestablished in 2012
1989 establishments in England
2012 disestablishments in England